The Puerto Rican Football Federation is the governing body of association football in Puerto Rico. It was founded in 1940 and became affiliated to FIFA in 1960, one of the last to do so in the Western Hemisphere. It governs over all football on the island, including the Puerto Rico national football team, the amateur Liga Nacional de Fútbol de Puerto Rico, the scheduled Liga Profesional de Fútbol de Puerto Rico, as well as the Puerto Rico FC who played in the North American Soccer League.

History
Owing to its unique status in relation to the United States of America, the governance of football on Puerto Rico has been different from the traditional format. On May 14, 2008, the federation announced the creation of the Puerto Rico Soccer League, the first unified league in the history of the island's football, although it folded in 2011. In recent years the Federation has attempted to overhaul the island's historic underperformance in football, which has been helped by the co-operation from a number of established club teams from around the world, who are keen to build up a base in Puerto Rico.

On March 9, 2015, The executive committee of the Puerto Rican Football Federation (FPF) approved a resolution specifying that in Puerto Rico there will be only one division league, before then the FPF statutes allowed for more than one first division league in Puerto Rico.

Staff

National teams

Puerto Rico men's national football team

Puerto Rico national under-20 football team

Puerto Rico national under-17 football team

Puerto Rico national under-15 football team

Puerto Rico women's national football team

Presidents 
 Paco Bueso
 José Laureano Cantero 
 Cristo Manuel Romero Sánchez (1968–1969)
 José M. Arsuaga
 Dr. Roberto Monroig
 Esteban Rodríguez Estrella (1982–1984)
 Luis Russi Dilán (1994–2002)
 Joe Serralta (2004–2010)
 Eric Labrador (2011–2019)
 Iván Rivera (2019–present)

See also

 Puerto Rico national football team
 Puerto Rican football league system
 Association Football in Puerto Rico
 Puerto Rico Islanders
 Liga Nacional de Fútbol de Puerto Rico
 Liga Puerto Rico
 Puerto Rico Soccer League
 Puerto Rico Capitals

References

External links
  
 Puerto Rico at the FIFA website
 Puerto Rico at CONCACAF site

Puerto Rico
Football in Puerto Rico
Sports governing bodies in Puerto Rico
Sports organizations established in 1940
1940 establishments in Puerto Rico
Organizations based in San Juan, Puerto Rico